The 2011 MTV Video Music Awards took place on August 28, at Nokia Theatre in Los Angeles, honoring the best music videos from the previous year. On July 20, the nominees were announced. Katy Perry received the most nominations this year at ten, followed by Adele, and Kanye West, who were both tied at seven. A Britney Spears tribute was held, consisting of adult and children dancers alike, they wore costumes based on the music videos of Spears. Hamish Hamilton directed the show.

At the ceremony, Katy Perry won three awards, including top prize Video of the Year for "Firework". Adele also won three awards, all in the technical fields, including Best Cinematography, Best Art Direction and Best Editing for "Rolling in the Deep". Britney Spears won a total of two awards, Best Pop Video for her single "Till the World Ends" and the Michael Jackson Video Vanguard Award for her influence and impact in music. Lady Gaga also won two awards, including Best Female Video for "Born This Way".
Other winners included Beyoncé, Justin Bieber, Tyler, the Creator, Nicki Minaj, Kanye West (shared with Perry), Foo Fighters, and the Beastie Boys who all won one apiece.

During the awards ceremony, Beyoncé revealed that she was pregnant with her first child, when she ended her performance of "Love on Top" (2011). The Huffington Post later confirmed that Knowles was five-months pregnant and her pregnancy announcement had broken the "most tweets per second recorded for a single event" Twitter record, receiving 8,868 tweets per second. MTV reported that Knowles' performance of "Love on Top" and the announcement of her pregnancy at the awards ceremony combined with Britney Spears tribute helped 2011's MTV Video Music Awards become the most-watched broadcast in MTV history, pulling in 12.4 million viewers. In addition, data from Google Insights showed that the most searched for term from August 29, 2011 to September 4, 2011 was "Beyonce pregnant" which reached 'breakout' levels – a term used by Google to describe a search with an increase of over 5,000 percent.

Performances

Presenters
 Kevin Hart – opened the show and introduced the first set of presenters
 Jonah Hill and Nicki Minaj – presented Best Pop Video
 Miley Cyrus and Shaun White – presented Best Rock Video
 Will Ferrell, Seth Rogen, Jack Black (as the Beastie Boys) and Odd Future – presented Best Hip-Hop Video
 Beavis and Butt-Head and Nicki Minaj - performed a comedy sketch
 Demi Lovato and Chord Overstreet – presented Best Collaboration
 Rick Ross and Paul Rudd – introduced Pitbull, Ne-Yo and Nayer
 Katy Perry – introduced Adele
 Kim Kardashian – presented Best Male Video
 Joe Jonas and Victoria Justice – introduced Chris Brown
 Lady Gaga (as Jo Calderone) – introduced the Britney Spears tribute performance and presented the Michael Jackson Video Vanguard award
 Britney Spears and Lady Gaga – introduced Beyoncé
 Selena Gomez and Taylor Lautner – presented Best New Artist
 Jared Leto and Zoe Saldana – introduced Young the Giant
 Cloris Leachman, Sammi Giancola, Snooki, Deena Nicole Cortese and JWoww – presented Best Female Video
 Russell Brand – presented the Amy Winehouse tribute introducing Tony Bennett and Bruno Mars
 Tony Bennett – introduced a clip of his recording sessions with Amy Winehouse
 Jennifer Lawrence – introduced a clip of The Hunger Games
 Katie Holmes – presented Video of the Year
 Drake – introduced Lil Wayne

Awards
Nominees were announced on July 20, 2011. Winners are in bold.

Video of the Year
  Katy Perry – "Firework"
 Adele – "Rolling in the Deep"
 Beastie Boys – "Make Some Noise"
 Bruno Mars – "Grenade"
 Tyler, the Creator – "Yonkers"

Best Male Video
  Justin Bieber – "U Smile"
 Eminem (featuring Rihanna) – "Love the Way You Lie"
 Cee-Lo Green – "Fuck You"
 Bruno Mars – "Grenade"
 Kanye West (featuring Rihanna and Kid Cudi) – "All of the Lights"

Best Female Video
  "Lady Gaga – "Born This Way"
 Adele – "Rolling in the Deep"
 Beyoncé – "Run the World (Girls)"
 Nicki Minaj – "Super Bass"
 Katy Perry – "Firework"

Best New Artist
  Tyler, The Creator – "Yonkers"
 Big Sean (featuring Chris Brown) – "My Last"
 Foster the People – "Pumped Up Kicks"
 Kreayshawn – "Gucci Gucci"
 Wiz Khalifa – "Black and Yellow"

Best Pop Video
  Britney Spears – "Till the World Ends"
 Adele – "Rolling in the Deep"
 Bruno Mars – "Grenade"
 Katy Perry – "Last Friday Night (T.G.I.F.)"
 Pitbull (featuring Ne-Yo, Nayer and Afrojack) – "Give Me Everything"

Best Rock Video
  Foo Fighters – "Walk"
 The Black Keys – "Howlin' for You"
 Cage the Elephant – "Shake Me Down"
 Foster the People – "Pumped Up Kicks"
 Mumford & Sons – "The Cave"

Best Hip-Hop Video
  Nicki Minaj – "Super Bass"
 Chris Brown (featuring Lil Wayne and Busta Rhymes) – "Look at Me Now"
 Lupe Fiasco – "The Show Goes On"
 Lil Wayne (featuring Cory Gunz) – "6 Foot 7 Foot"
 Kanye West (featuring Rihanna and Kid Cudi) – "All of the Lights"

Best Collaboration
  Katy Perry (featuring Kanye West) – "E.T."
 Chris Brown (featuring Lil Wayne and Busta Rhymes) – "Look at Me Now"
 Nicki Minaj (featuring Drake) – "Moment 4 Life"
 Pitbull (featuring Ne-Yo, Nayer, and Afrojack) – "Give Me Everything"
 Kanye West (featuring Rihanna and Kid Cudi) – "All of the Lights"

Best Direction
  Beastie Boys – "Make Some Noise" (Director: Adam Yauch)
 Adele – "Rolling in the Deep" (Director: Sam Brown)
 Eminem (featuring Rihanna) – "Love the Way You Lie" (Director: Joseph Kahn)
 Katy Perry (featuring Kanye West) – "E.T." (Director: Floria Sigismondi)
 Thirty Seconds to Mars – "Hurricane" (Director: Bartholomew Cubbins)

Best Choreography
  Beyoncé – "Run the World (Girls)" (Choreographer: Frank Gatson, Sheryl Murakami and Jeffrey Page)
 Lady Gaga – "Judas" (Choreographer: Laurieann Gibson)
 LMFAO (featuring Lauren Bennett and GoonRock) – "Party Rock Anthem" (Choreographer: Hokuto Konishi)
 Bruno Mars – "The Lazy Song" (Choreographers: Bruno Mars and Poreotics)
 Britney Spears – "Till the World Ends" (Choreographer: Brian Friedman)

Best Special Effects
  Katy Perry (featuring Kanye West) – "E.T." (Special Effects: Jeff Dotson for Dot & Effects)
 Chromeo – "Don't Turn the Lights On" (Special Effects: The Mill)
 Linkin Park – "Waiting for the End" (Special Effects: Ghost Town Media)
 Manchester Orchestra – "Simple Math" (Special Effects: DANIELS)
 Kanye West (featuring Dwele) – "Power" (Special Effects: Nice Shoes and ArtJail)

Best Art Direction
  Adele – "Rolling in the Deep" (Art Director: Nathan Parker)
 Death Cab for Cutie – "You Are a Tourist" (Art Directors: Nick Gould, Tim Nackashi and Anthony Maitz)
 Lady Gaga – "Judas" (Art Director: Amy Danger)
 Katy Perry (featuring Kanye West) – "E.T." (Art Director: Jason Fijal)
 Kanye West (featuring Dwele) – "Power" (Art Director: Babak Radboy)

Best Editing
  Adele – "Rolling in the Deep" (Editor: Art Jones at Work)
 Manchester Orchestra – "Simple Math" (Editors: DANIELS)
 Katy Perry (featuring Kanye West) – "E.T." (Editor: Jarrett Fijal)
 Thirty Seconds to Mars – "Hurricane" (Editors: Jared Leto, Frank Snider, Michael Bryson, Stefanie Visser and Daniel Carberry)
 Kanye West (featuring Rihanna and Kid Cudi) – "All of the Lights" (Editor: Hadaya Turner)

Best Cinematography
  Adele – "Rolling in the Deep" (Director of Photography: Tom Townend)
 Beyoncé – "Run the World (Girls)" (Director of Photography: Jeffrey Kimball)
 Eminem (featuring Rihanna) – "Love the Way You Lie" (Director of Photography: Christopher Probst)
 Katy Perry – "Teenage Dream" (Director of Photography: Paul Laufer)
 Thirty Seconds to Mars – "Hurricane" (Directors of Photography: Benoît Debie, Jared Leto, Rob Witt and Daniel Carberry)

Best Video with a Message
   Lady Gaga – "Born This Way"
 Eminem (featuring Rihanna) – "Love the Way You Lie"
 Katy Perry – "Firework"
 Pink – "Fuckin' Perfect"
 Rise Against – "Make It Stop (September's Children)"
 Taylor Swift – "Mean"

Best Latino Artist
  Wisin & Yandel – "Zun Zun Rompiendo Caderas"
 Don Omar and Lucenzo – "Danza Kuduro"
 Enrique Iglesias (featuring Ludacris and DJ Frank E) – "Tonight (I'm Lovin' You)"
 Maná – "Lluvia al Corazón"
 Prince Royce – "Corazón Sin Cara"

Michael Jackson Video Vanguard Award
 Britney Spears

References

See also
2011 MTV Europe Music Awards

External links
Official VMA site

2011
MTV Video Music Awards
MTV Video Music
MTV Video Music Awards
2011 in Los Angeles